Dream of Life is the fifth studio album by Patti Smith, released in June 1988 on Arista Records.

Recording and release

Dream of Life was her first album after the dissolution of The Patti Smith Group, and the only album that she made with her husband Fred "Sonic" Smith. Lead single "People Have the Power" received some album-oriented rock airplay at the time, and later was revived by Michael Stipe as a theme song for the 2004 Vote for Change concerts. "People Have the Power" was performed live for the first time by Patti and Fred Smith at the Arista Records 15th Anniversary Gala at Radio City Music Hall on  March 17, 1990. "Paths That Cross" is dedicated to the memory of Samuel J. Wagstaff. The cover photograph is by Robert Mapplethorpe.

Reception

Dream of Life received generally favorable reviews from critics, who ranked the album number 31 in The Village Voices 1988 Pazz & Jop critics' poll. It was also ranked number 49 on Sounds magazine's list of the best albums of the year.

Track listing
All songs were written by Patti Smith and Fred "Sonic" Smith.

Side one
 "People Have the Power" – 5:07
 "Going Under" – 5:57
 "Up There Down There" – 4:47
 "Paths That Cross" – 4:18

Side two
 "Dream of Life" – 4:38
 "Where Duty Calls" – 7:46
 "Looking for You (I Was)" – 4:04
 "The Jackson Song" – 5:24

CD reissue
 "People Have the Power" – 5:09
 "Up There Down There" – 4:49
 "Paths That Cross" – 4:19
 "Dream of Life" – 4:39
 "Where Duty Calls" – 7:48
 "Going Under" – 6:00
 "Looking for You (I Was)" – 4:06
 "The Jackson Song" – 5:25
 "As the Night Goes By" (bonus track) – 5:04
 "Wild Leaves" (bonus track) – 4:03

Personnel

 Patti Smith – vocals
 Fred "Sonic" Smith – guitar, production
 Jay Dee Daugherty – drums, keyboards, consultant
 Richard Sohl – keyboards

Additional personnel
 Andi Ostrowe – backing vocals
 Bob Glaub – bass on "Going Under"
 Errol "Crusher" Bennett – percussion on "Looking for You (I Was)"
 Gary Rasmussen – bass
 Hearn Gadbois – percussion
 Jesse Levy – cello on "The Jackson Song"
 Kasim Sulton – bass
 Malcolm West – bass on "The Jackson Song"
 Margaret Ross – harp on "The Jackson Song"
 Robin Nash – backing vocals on "Going Under"
 Sammy Figueroa – percussion

Technical
 Scott Litt – associate producer, mixing, assistant producer
 Thom Panunzio, Kevin Killen, Jay Healy, Jim Michewicz, Brian Sperber – engineer
 Robert De La Garza, Roger Talkov, Rob Jacobs, Rich Travali, Marc DeSisto, Dave McNair, Bill Dooley – assistant engineer
 Shelly Yakus – mixing
 Bob Ludwig, Vic Anesini – mastering
 Maude Gilman – design
 Robert Mapplethorpe – photography

Charts

References

External links
 

1988 albums
Albums produced by Fred "Sonic" Smith
Albums produced by Jimmy Iovine
Arista Records albums
Patti Smith albums